Stars are luminous astronomical objects.

Stars or STARS may also refer to:

Arts and entertainment

Fictional entities
 S.T.A.R. Labs, an organization in the DC Comics fictional universe
 S.T.A.R.S., a police group in the Resident Evil series
 S.T.A.R.S., an organisation in the Marvel Universe

Music

Groups
 Stars (Australian band), from the 1970s
 Stars (British band), a 1972 supergroup
 Stars (Canadian band), an indie rock group formed in 2000
 The Stars (band), a Japanese psychedelic rock group

Albums
 Stars (Cher album)
 Stars (Collabro album)
 Stars (Janis Ian album)
 Stars, an album by Lala Karmela
 Stars (Makai album)
 Stars (Simply Red album)
 Stars (Sylvester album)
 Stars: The Best of 1992–2002, by The Cranberries

Songs
 "Stars" (Chloë song)
 "Stars" (Dan Fogelberg song)
 "Stars" (Destine song)
 "Stars" (Dubstar song)
 "Stars" (Grace Potter and the Nocturnals song)
 "Stars" (Hum song)
 "Stars" (Erika Jayne song)
 "Stars" (Janis Ian song)
 "Stars" (Mika Nakashima song)
 "Stars" (Roxette song)
 "Stars" (Simply Red song)
 "Stars" (Switchfoot song)
 "Stars", by Alessia Cara from Know-It-All
 "Stars", by Angel Olsen from Burn Your Fire for No Witness
 "Stars", by China Black
 "Stars", by The Cranberries from Stars: The Best of 1992–2002
 "Stars", by Kat DeLuna
 "Stars", by fun. from Some Nights
 "Stars", by Mark Gormley
 "Stars", by Hear 'n Aid
 "Stars", by Janis Ian
 "Stars", by Javert from the musical Les Misérables
 "Stars", by Lala Karmela from Stars
 "Stars", by Demi Lovato from Confident
 "Stars", by Cheryl from Only Human
 "Stars", by Kylie Minogue from X
 "Stars", by Mark Owen from The Art of Doing Nothing
 "Stars", by Sixx:A.M. from Modern Vintage
 "Stars", by Superfly and Tortoise Matsumoto
 "Stars", by Sylvester from Stars
 "Stars", by t.A.T.u. from 200 km/h in the Wrong Lane
 "The Stars", by Moby from Last Night
 "The Stars", by Patrick Wolf from The Magic Position

Other uses in arts and entertainment
 The Stars (TV series), 1988 UK astronomy programme
 Stars!, a 1995 game for Windows
 The F.A. Premier League Stars, a 1999 videogame
 "The Stars", a story about a shepherd by Alphonse Daudet
 Stars (M. C. Escher), a 1948 wood engraving print by M. C. Escher
 The Stars Art Group, a Chinese group of artists in the late 1970s and early 1980s

Science and technology
 Stars (shader effect), a computer graphics effect used by computer games
 AMD 10h (unofficial code name: Stars), a microarchitecture
 Stars virus, a computer virus
 Space Tethered Autonomous Robotic Satellite, a satellite built by Kagawa University
 STARS-II, a follow-on project

Sports

Baseball
 Cleveland Stars (baseball), a defunct Negro league baseball team
 Cuban Stars (East), a defunct Negro league baseball team
 Cuban Stars (West), a defunct Negro league baseball team
 Detroit Stars, a defunct Negro league baseball team
 Hollywood Stars, an American minor league baseball team that operated 1926–1935 and 1938–1957
 Huntsville Stars, a current American minor league baseball team
 Lincoln Stars (baseball), a defunct Negro league baseball team
 Newark Stars, a defunct Negro league baseball team
 Philadelphia Stars (baseball), a defunct Negro league baseball team
 St. Louis Stars (baseball), a defunct Negro league baseball team

Basketball
 Los Angeles Stars, a basketball team from 1968 to 1970
 Los Angeles Stars (2000–2001), a basketball team from 2000 to 2001
 Los Angeles Stars (2004–2005), a basketball team from 2004 to 2005
 Rutronik Stars Keltern, German women's team
 Utah Stars, an American basketball team from 1970 to 1976, formerly the Los Angeles Stars
 Shandong Stars (disambiguation), several teams from China

Cricket
 Melbourne Stars, an Australian Big Bash League cricket team
 South East Stars, an English women's cricket team
 Surrey Stars, an English women's cricket team

Football
 Minnesota Stars FC, an American soccer team
 Supporters' Trust at Reading, a Reading Football Club supporters' organization

Ice hockey
 Dallas Stars, an American National Hockey League team
 Texas Stars, a team in the American Hockey League

Other uses
 stars, the plural of star, see Star (disambiguation)
 Stars (restaurant), a defunct restaurant in San Francisco, California, US
 Shock Trauma Air Rescue Service, a Canadian air ambulance service
 Fulton surface-to-air recovery system, used to retrieve persons on the ground using an aircraft
 Standard Terminal Automation Replacement System, an air traffic control system

See also

 
 
 Star (disambiguation)
 Starz (disambiguation)
 
 Utah Starzz, a Women's National Basketball Association team
 Utah Starzz (WPSL), women's soccer team